Michael Alan Darrell (born 14 January 1947), commonly known as Mick or Mike Darrell, is an English former professional footballer who made more than 100 appearances in the Football League playing for Birmingham City, Newport County, Gillingham and Peterborough United. He played as a midfielder.

Darrell was born in Bilston, Staffordshire. When he left school in 1962 he joined Birmingham City as an apprentice, turning professional two-and-a-half years later. He made his debut as an 18-year-old, scoring in a 5–1 defeat at Bury in the Second Division on 16 October 1965. He started the next five games, in the absence of Geoff Vowden and Malcolm Beard, but over the next five years he appeared only occasionally for Birmingham, mainly as substitute, and spent periods on loan at Newport County and Gillingham. In 1971 Darrell joined Peterborough United of the Fourth Division. After 42 league games he returned to the Black Country to play for Bilston and Darlaston in the West Midlands (Regional) League.

References

1947 births
Living people
People from Bilston
English footballers
Association football midfielders
Birmingham City F.C. players
Newport County A.F.C. players
Gillingham F.C. players
Peterborough United F.C. players
Bilston Town F.C. players
English Football League players
Darlaston Town F.C. players